The 11th International Film Festival of India was held from 10-24 January 1987 in New Delhi. The festival gave a breakthrough for commercial cinema, through the introduction of "Indian Mainstream section". India's official entry for the Best Foreign Language Film for the Academy Awards in 1986 - "Swati Mutyam" was screened in the mainstream section.

Winners
Golden Peacock (Best Film):  Golden Peacock Award: "Farewell Green Summer" by Elyer Ishmukhamedov (Russian film)
Golden Peacock (Best Short Film) Not Awarded
IFFI Best Actor Award (Male) (Silver Peacock) "Raghubir Yadav" for "Massey Sahib" (Indian film)
IFFI Best Actor Award (Female) (Silver Peacock) "Fernanda Torres" for "Love Me Forever or Never" (Brazilian film)

References

1987 film festivals
11
1987 in Indian cinema